James Madison (1751–1836) was the president of the United States from 1809 to 1817.

James Madison may also refer to:

 James Madison Sr. (1723–1801), American farmer and entrepreneur
 James Madison (bishop) (1749–1812), American bishop
 James Madison (Medal of Honor) (1842–1926), United States Army sergeant and Medal of Honor recipient
 James Jonas Madison (1884–1922), American sailor & Medal of Honor recipient
 James Madison (born 1956/57), American bank robber a.k.a. the Mad Hatter
 James Madison (musician) (1935–2008), known as James "Pee Wee" Madison, the blues guitar player from the band Muddy Waters
 James S. Madison (1846–1892), Mississippi politician
 James H. Madison, American writer

See also
 James Maddison (born 1996), English footballer
 James Madison University, a university located in Harrisonburg, Virginia
 James Madison Dukes, the university's athletic program
 Jimmy Madison (disambiguation)
 USS James Madison, several ships